Young Airport  is an airport serving Young, New South Wales, Australia.

Facilities

Accidents and incidents
 On the evening of 11 June 1993 Monarch Airlines flight 301, a Piper PA-31-350 Navajo Chieftain flying from Sydney to Cootamundra via Young crashed  from the airport while on approach to runway 01, killing all seven on board. The aircraft was attempting a third approach when the crash occurred. The investigation into the accident revealed the aircraft had been operating without a working autopilot and several other instruments in breach of regulations.

See also
List of airports in New South Wales

References

External links
 

Airports in New South Wales
Young, New South Wales